Franklin Mall may refer to:

 Washington Crown Center, formerly Franklin Mall, a shopping mall in North Franklin Township, Washington County, Pennsylvania
 Franklin P. Mall (1862–1917), American anatomist and pathologist

See all 
 Franklin Park Mall, a shopping mall in Toledo, Ohio